The following is the 1993–94 network television schedule for the four major English language commercial broadcast networks in the United States. The schedule covers primetime hours from September 1993 through August 1994. The schedule is followed by a list per network of returning series, new series, and series cancelled after the 1992–93 season. All times are Eastern and Pacific, with certain exceptions, such as Monday Night Football.

New series are highlighted in bold.

Each of the 30 highest-rated shows is listed with its rank and rating as determined by Nielsen Media Research.

 Yellow indicates the programs in the top 10 for the season.
 Cyan indicates the programs in the top 20 for the season.
 Magenta indicates the programs in the top 30 for the season.

Other Legend
 Light blue indicates local programming.
 Gray indicates encore programming.
 Blue-gray indicates news programming.
 Light green indicates sporting events.
 Light Purple indicates movies. 
 Red indicates series being burned off and other regularly scheduled programs, including specials.

Note: This is the first season in which Fox commenced television broadcasts on every night of the week from the beginning of the season onward.

PBS, the Public Broadcasting Service, is not included; member television stations have local flexibility over most of their schedules and broadcast times for network shows may vary. From February 12 to 27, 1994, all of CBS' primetime programming was preempted in favor of coverage of the 1994 Winter Olympics in Lillehammer.

Sunday

Monday

Tuesday

Wednesday 
{| class="wikitable" style="width:100%;margin-right:0;text-align:center"
|-
! style="background-color:#C0C0C0;text-align:center" colspan="2"| Network
! style="background-color:#C0C0C0;text-align:center"| 8:00 PM
! style="background-color:#C0C0C0;text-align:center"| 8:30 PM
! style="background-color:#C0C0C0;text-align:center"| 9:00 PM
! style="background-color:#C0C0C0;text-align:center"| 9:30 PM
! style="background-color:#C0C0C0;text-align:center"| 10:00 PM
! style="background-color:#C0C0C0;text-align:center"| 10:30 PM
|-
! rowspan="7" | ABC
! Fall
| rowspan="4"| Thea
| Joe's Life
| bgcolor="#FFFF00" rowspan="7" | Home Improvement (2/20.4)
| bgcolor="#FFFF00" rowspan="4" | Grace Under Fire (5/17.7)
| colspan="2" | Moon Over Miami|-
! December
| rowspan="2" | George| bgcolor="#FA8072" colspan="2" | Various Specials|-
! January
| rowspan="2" colspan="2" | Birdland|-
! Follow Up
| The Critic|-
! Spring
| bgcolor="#C0C0C0"| Home Improvement (Repeats)
| bgcolor="#00FFFF"| Thunder Alley (12/15.9)
| These Friends of Mine | bgcolor="#00FFFF" rowspan="3" colspan="2" | Turning Point (20/13.8)
|-
! Summer
| Dinosaurs| The Critic| bgcolor="#FFFF00" rowspan="2" | Grace Under Fire (5/17.7)
|-
! August
| bgcolor="#00FFFF"| Thunder Alley (12/15.9)
| bgcolor="#FF22FF"| Phenom (27/13.2)(Tied with Evening Shade and Rescue 911)
|-
! rowspan="7" | CBS
! Fall
| colspan="6" bgcolor="lightgreen" | MLB on CBS|-
! Late October
| rowspan="2"|Hearts Afire| rowspan="2"|The Nanny| colspan="2"|South of Sunset| bgcolor="#77AACC" colspan="2" rowspan="6" | 48 Hours|-
! November
| bgcolor="#FA8072" colspan="2" | Various Specials|-
! Winter
| rowspan="4"|The Nanny| Hearts Afire| colspan="2" rowspan="2" | In the Heat of the Night|-
! Spring
| Tom|-
! Summer
| Good Advice| bgcolor="#77AACC" colspan="2" rowspan="2" | America Tonight|-
! August
| Muddling Through|-
! rowspan="2" | Fox
! Fall
| rowspan="2" colspan="2" | Beverly Hills, 90210| colspan="2" | Melrose Place| style="background-color:#abbfff;" colspan="2" rowspan="2"| Local Programming
|-
! Mid-Summer
| colspan="2"|Models Inc.|-
! colspan="2" | NBC
| colspan="2" | Unsolved Mysteries| bgcolor="#77AACC" colspan="2" | Now with Tom Brokaw and Katie Couric| colspan="2" | Law & Order|}

Note: After airing only a single episode of South of Sunset on October 27, CBS cancelled the show and broadcast no further episodes.

 Thursday 

 Friday 

Note: On CBS, Good Advice was to have returned on this night at 9 p.m., followed by Bob at 9:30 p.m. Late changes resulted in Bob beginning at 9 p.m., Family Album moving to 9:30 p.m. in mid-October, It Had to Be You being canceled at the same time, and Good Advice not returning till the following May. Additionally, Diagnosis: Murder premiered in late October to fill the 8–9 p.m. hour.

 Saturday 

Note: NBC was scheduled to show its portion of Baseball Night in America in August and September 1994, but those games were cancelled by the Major League Baseball players' strike.

By network
ABC

Returning series20/20The ABC Sunday Night MovieAmerica's Funniest Home VideosAmerica's Funniest PeopleCoachThe CommishDay OneDinosaursFamily MattersFBI: The Untold StoriesFull HouseHangin' with Mr. CooperHome ImprovementMatlockMonday Night FootballPrimetime LiveRoseanneStep by StepWhere I LiveNew seriesBaseball Night in AmericaBirdland *Boy Meets WorldThe Byrds of Paradise *The Critic *Ellen *GeorgeGrace Under FireJoe's LifeLois & Clark: The New Adventures of SupermanMissing PersonsMoon Over MiamiNYPD BlueThe Paula Poundstone ShowPhenomShe TV *Sister, Sister *TheaThunder Alley *Turning Point *

Not returning from 1992–93:American DetectiveCamp WilderCivil WarsCovington CrossCrossroadsDeltaDoogie Howser, M.D.Getting By (moved to NBC)Going to ExtremesHome FreeHomefrontJack's PlaceThe Jackie Thomas ShowLaurie HillLife Goes OnPerfect StrangersRoom for TwoSirens (moved to syndication in 1994)Street MatchThe Wonder YearsThe Young Indiana Jones ChroniclesWild PalmsCBS

Returning series48 Hours60 MinutesBobDr. Quinn, Medicine WomanEvening ShadeGood AdviceHearts AfireIn the Heat of the NightLove & WarMurder, She WroteMurphy BrownNorthern ExposurePicket FencesRescue 911Walker, Texas RangerNew series704 Hauser *America Tonight *Angel FallsBurke's Law *Christy *Dave's WorldDiagnosis: Murder *Eye to Eye with Connie ChungFamily AlbumHarts of the WestHotel Malibu *It Had to Be YouMuddling Through *The NannyOne West Waikiki *The Road Home *Second Chances *South of SunsetTom *Traps *

Not returning from 1992–93:Angel StreetBodies of EvidenceThe BoysBrooklyn BridgeThe BuildingCuttersDesigning WomenDudleyFamily DogFrannie's TurnThe Golden PalaceThe Hat SquadHow'd They Do That?Johnny BagoKnots LandingA League of Their OwnMajor DadMiddle AgesRavenSpace RangersStreet Stories with Ed BradleyTop CopsTall HopesThe Trouble with LarryFox

Returning seriesAmerica's Most WantedBeverly Hills, 90210Code 3Comic Strip LiveCOPSFOX Night at the MoviesThe Front PageHerman's HeadIn Living ColorMarried... with ChildrenMartinMelrose PlaceRocThe SimpsonsNew seriesThe Adventures of Brisco County, Jr.Bakersfield P.D.Daddy DearestEncounters: The Hidden Truth *The George Carlin Show *Living SingleModels Inc.Monty *The Sinbad ShowSouth Central *Townsend TelevisionThe X-FilesNot returning from 1992–93:Batman: The Animated Series (returned to daytime)The Ben Stiller ShowClass of '96Danger TheatreDown the ShoreThe EdgeFlying BlindGreat Scott!The HeightsKey WestLikely SuspectsParker Lewis Can't LoseShaky GroundSightings (moved to syndication)TriBeCaWoops!NBC

Returning seriesBlossomDateline NBCEmpty NestThe Fresh Prince of Bel-AirGetting By (moved from ABC)Homicide: Life on the StreetI Witness VideoL.A. LawLaw & OrderMad About YouNBC Sunday Night MovieThe NBC Monday MovieNursesSeinfeldSistersUnsolved MysteriesWingsNew seriesAgainst the GrainCafé AmericainFrasierThe Good Life *The John Larroquette ShowThe MommiesNow with Tom Brokaw and Katie Couric *Saved by the Bell: The College YearsseaQuest DSVThe Second HalfSomeone Like Me *Viper *Winnetka Road *

Not returning from 1992–93:Almost HomeBlack Tie AffairCheersCrime & PunishmentA Different WorldFinal AppealHere and NowI'll Fly AwayOut All NightThe Powers That BeQuantum LeapReasonable DoubtsRhythm & BluesThe Round TableRoute 66Secret ServiceSouth BeachSuper Bloopers and New Practical JokesWhat Happened?''

Note: The * indicates that the program was introduced in midseason.

References

United States primetime network television schedules
United States Network Television Schedule, 1993-94
United States Network Television Schedule, 1993-94